Frederick Preston Burgan (born January 1, 1881) was an American football player and coach. He served as the head football coach at Hamline University from 1908 to 1909.

References

American football ends
American football halfbacks
Minnesota Golden Gophers football players
Hamline Pipers football coaches
High school football coaches in Minnesota
People from Douglas County, Minnesota
Players of American football from Minnesota
1881 births
Year of death missing